The Fathomless Mastery is the third full-length album by Swedish death metal band Bloodbath, released on 29 September 2008 via Peaceville. It is the band's last studio album to feature vocalist Mikael Åkerfeldt and the first to feature lead guitarist Per Eriksson. A video was made for "Hades Rising", directed by Owe Lingwall and shot on location in Vallentuna, near Stockholm. The album peaked at No. 45 on the Heatseekers Chart in the US on release.

The album was reissued in 2011, bundled together with the tracks from the Unblessing the Purity EP released in 2008.

Background 
Former Scar Symmetry vocalist Christian Älvestam performed guest vocals on the sixth track, "Iesous".

The outro of the final track, "Wretched Human Mirror", features samples from the movie I Am Legend.

Track listing

Personnel

Bloodbath
 Mikael Åkerfeldt – vocals
 Anders Nyström – rhythm guitar
 Jonas Renkse – bass
 Martin Axenrot – drums
 Per Eriksson – lead guitar

Additional musician
 Christian Älvestam – guest vocals

Production and design
 Bloodbath - production
 David Castillo - production, engineering, mixing
 Björn Engelmann - mastering
 Dusty Peterson - artwork
 Robin Bergh - photography

References

2008 albums
Bloodbath albums
Peaceville Records albums